Etnefjorden is a fjord on the border between Vestland and Rogaland counties in Norway. The majority of the fjord lies in the municipality of Etne, but a small part of it also lies in the neighboring municipality of Vindafjord in Rogaland county. The fjord is fed by the Etneelva river which empties into the fjord at the village of Etnesjøen. The European route E134 highway runs along the inner part of the fjord.

See also
 List of Norwegian fjords

References

Fjords of Vestland
Fjords of Rogaland
Etne
Vindafjord